The National Day of Cameroon, also known as Unity Day (fête nationale de l’unité), is celebrated annually on 20 May. In a national referendum on 20 May 1972, Cameroonians voted for a unitary state as opposed to the existing federal state. The United Nations Trust Territory known as French Cameroun achieved independence from France on 1 January 1960, and British Southern Cameroons changed status from a Trusteeship under British administration to a federated state within Cameroon on 1 October 1961. The government chose 20 May as Cameroon's National Day to commemorate President Ahmadou Ahidjo's abolishment of the federal system of government in favor of a unitary country in 1972.

Even though it is considered a holiday, children all over the country go to schools and celebrate Unity Day usually by singing, carrying out parades or marches all around the different parts of their various cities. Speeches are made by the president of Cameroon and other important personalities. The day is presided over by the president in the capital, Yaoundé. In the regional capitals, it is presided by the governor who represents the government. The divisional officers preside over the day in their various divisions.

Events 
The 47th National Day was marked in Cameroon in 2019 amidst violence in Anglophone parts of the country. The main opposition parties, the Cameroon Renaissance Movement and Social Democratic Front, boycotted the events "in solidarity with the lives lost in the English speaking regions."

National Day festivities in the country were cancelled both in 2020 and 2021 as a result of the COVID-19 pandemic.

References

Further reading

 Mbaku, John Mukum (2005). Culture and Customs of Cameroon. Westport, Connecticut: Greenwood Press.

Cameroonian culture
National days
May observances